Ceratrichia nothus, commonly known as the white-winged forest sylph, is a species of butterfly in the family Hesperiidae. It is found in Guinea, Sierra Leone, Liberia, Ivory Coast, Ghana, Togo, Nigeria, Cameroon, Equatorial Guinea and the Central African Republic. The habitat consists of wetter forests.

Subspecies
Ceratrichia nothus nothus (Guinea, Sierra Leone, Liberia, Ivory Coast, western Ghana)
Ceratrichia nothus enantia (Karsch, 1893) (central Ghana, Togo, Nigeria)
Ceratrichia nothus makomensis Strand, 1913 (Nigeria, Cameroon, Equatorial Guinea)
Ceratrichia nothus yakoli Collins & Larsen, 2003 (Central African Republic)

References

Butterflies described in 1787
Hesperiinae